is a mountain with a height of  in Knoydart, in the Northwest Highlands of Scotland. It is on the southern shore of Loch Hourn, north-west of the Munro of Ladhar Bheinn.

References

Corbetts
Marilyns of Scotland
Mountains and hills of the Northwest Highlands